Eltron Programming Language (EPL) is a printer control language used to produce printed labels for various Eltron model printers.

It was superseded by Zebra Programming Language (ZPL) after Zebra Technologies acquired Eltron.

EPL2
EPL2 is a markup, line-at-a-time language, suitable for printing on media of reduced space, and although it supports bitmaps (and therefore, arbitrary images), its use is usually for labels including barcode information.

Each EPL2 line starts with one or more letters (indicating the command), and may be followed by one or more comma-separated arguments. Commands and arguments are case-sensitive.

Arguments that are numeric or belong to a fixed set of options (see i.e. the reverse argument for A) are inlined, and any string or set of variable values must be surrounded by double-quotes (" - see i.e. the text argument for A).

References

Further reading

External links
 Git repository containing manuals for EPL and Java code

Page description languages